Gunwant Desai (born 30 January 1941) is a former cricketer who played first-class cricket for Railways in India from 1968 to 1974.

Desai was a highly effective opening bowler for Railways in the Ranji Trophy, averaging nearly five wickets a match at a very low average and with a strike-rate of a wicket every 34.75 balls. He took 12 wickets in the match (7 for 46 and 5 for 24) in the innings victory over Haryana in 1971-72. 

In 1974-75 he set a Railways record for match figures that still stands when he took 13 for 77 (8 for 54 and 5 for 23) in another innings victory, this time over Services. He also made his highest score in the same match when, batting as usual at number 11, he made 29 of a tenth-wicket stand of 30.

He was never selected to play for North Zone in the Duleep Trophy. He twice played in Ranji Trophy quarter-finals, each time against Rajasthan. The second time, in 1973-74, he felled the Test batsman Salim Durani with a bouncer, and Durani had to be taken to hospital for an operation and played no further part in the match. Rajasthan won narrowly on their first-innings lead. Railways were 241 for 9 when Desai went to the crease, needing 15 for the lead, but he was bowled for a duck.

References

External links

1941 births
Living people
Indian cricketers 
Railways cricketers